Tilehurst railway station is in the suburb and former village of Tilehurst, west of Reading, Berkshire, England.  The station is on the extreme northern edge of Tilehurst, and at a much lower level than most of that suburb. The railway line and station occupy a strip of land between the A329 road and the River Thames, with the up relief platform on an embankment above the river bank. 

History
The station is on the original line of the Great Western Railway, which opened in 1841, and was itself opened to traffic in 1882.

In 2013, the redundant Goods Shed was demolished to make way for a new footbridge. The new bridge was necessary to give clearance for the overhead line electrification of the line. The new footbridge was opened in early December 2013 and the old footbridge demolished the following week.

Services
The typical off-peak service is every 30 minutes in each direction Monday to Saturday and hourly on Sundays. Typical journey times are approximately 25 minutes to Didcot Parkway, 45 minutes to Oxford, 5 minutes to Reading, and just over 1 hour to London Paddington.

Facilities
The station has four platforms, one on each of the fast and relief (slow) lines, although the platforms on the fast lines see little use except during track works on the line between Reading and Didcot. The platforms are linked to each other and the station entrance, on the down fast platform, by a footbridge that is accessed by stairs and does not have lifts. Toilets are available in the building on the central platform. The station car park has spaces for 118 cars.

There is a waiting room on the middle platform. A small waiting room was built on the north platform, but although it looks old, it is of modern construction.

The main ticket office on the south side is manned usually on weekday mornings but tickets can also be purchased from an automatic machine using debit or credit cards only.

Future plans
There are future plans to upgrade the station, with the provision of lifts to access the footbridge and an upgrade to the station car park to provide a second level, increasing capacity to 217 cars. There are also plans for a new covered and secure cycle area for up to 100 bikes, extra retail facilities, and an upgraded station forecourt. These plans were announced in 2020, with an expected completion date in 2024 subject to funding.

In literature
The railway at Tilehurst was mentioned in less than glowing terms by Jerome K. Jerome in chapter 16 of Three Men in a Boat: "The river becomes very lovely from a little above Reading. The railway rather spoils it near Tilehurst, but from Mapledurham up to Streatley it is glorious."

References

External links

 Train times and station information, from National Rail

Buildings and structures in Reading, Berkshire
Transport in Reading, Berkshire
Railway stations in Berkshire
DfT Category E stations
Railway Station
Former Great Western Railway stations
Great Western Main Line
Railway stations in Great Britain opened in 1882
Railway stations served by Great Western Railway